The Georgia Yellow Hammers were an old-time string and vocal quartet from Gordon County, Georgia from the 1920s. The group featured Charles Moody, Jr. on guitar; Bud Landress on banjo; Phil Reeve on guitar; and Bill Chitwood on fiddle.  All members may have been multi-instrumentalists. Tony Russell's notes accompanying the 2004 compilation CD "Old Mountain" identify the personnel on "The Picture on the Wall" (Victor 20943, 9 Aug.1927) as Landress, fiddle and lead vocal; Reeve, guitar and vocal; C. Ernest Moody, banjo-ukulele and vocal; and Clyde Evans, guitar and vocal.

Collaboration with the Baxters 
The group often played with Andrew and Jim Baxter from Curryville, GA (also in Gordon County).  Curryville was also home to music legend Roland Hayes. Andrew Baxter's unique style of fiddle is heard an early recording of a band favorite entitled "G-Rag". The Baxters were African Americans, which was an unusual collaboration for the time period.  The band released one of the top selling records of 1920s southern music with 1927's release "The Picture on the Wall"/"My Carolina Girl".  The 1927 recording session with the Baxter's took place in Charlotte, NC, and was a rare integrated session, uncommon even through the mid to late 20th century.  Andrew and Jim Baxter were a well known duo for the time in their own right around Northwest Georgia.

Legacy 

The band is nationally recognized as an important 1920s "old-time" band.  Their songs can still be heard from early recordings on such sites as YouTube.com and others.  The song "Drifting Too Far From The Shore" written by member Charles Moody has been covered by such artists as Jerry Garcia, Emmylou Harris, Phil Lesh & Friends, Hank Williams, and many others, as well as being a standard in many gospel hymnals.  The Calhoun High School football stadium in Calhoun, Georgia is also named after the guitar player and founding member Phil Reeve.

Georgia Yellow Hammers recorded songs including:

Mary, Don't You Weep

I'm S-A-V-E-D

Pass around the Bottle

Fourth of July at a County Fair (1927)

Going to Ride That Midnight Train

Tennessee Coon (1927)

My Carolina Girl (1927)

G Rag with Andrew Baxter (1927 Aug. 9)

Peaches down in Georgia

Picture on the Wall (1928)

Further reading 
 Wayne W. Daniel, Pickin' on Peachtree: A History of Country Music in Atlanta, Georgia (Urbana: University of Illinois Press, 1990), 76-77.
 The Encyclopedia of Country Music, ed. Paul Kingsbury (New York: Oxford University Press, 1998), s.v. "Georgia Yellow Hammers."
 Gene Wiggins and Tony Russell, "Hell Broke Loose in Gordon County, Georgia," Old Time Music 25 (summer 1977): 9-21.
 Charles K. Wolfe, "The Georgia Yellow Hammers," in Classic Country: Legends of Country Music (New York: Routledge, 2001).
 Tony Russell, Old Time Music Journal

References 

Old-time bands
Country music groups from Georgia (U.S. state)